

Bi

Bia-Bid  

bialamicol (INN)
Biamine Injection
biapenem (INN)
Biavax II (Merck)
Biaxin (Abbott Laboratories)
bibapcitide (INN)
bibenzonium bromide (INN)
bicalutamide (INN)
bicifadine (INN)
Bicillin (Pfizer)
biciromab (INN)
biclodil (INN)
biclofibrate (INN)
biclotymol (INN)
BiCNU (Bristol-Myers Squibb)
bicozamycin (INN)
bidimazium iodide (INN)
bidisomide (INN)

Bie-Bio  

bietamiverine (INN)
bietaserpine (INN)
bifarcept (INN)
bifemelane (INN)
bifepramide (INN)
bifeprofen (INN)
bifeprunox (USAN)
bifluranol (INN)
bifonazole (INN)
Bile-zyme (Seacoast Vitamins)
Bilivist (Berlex, Inc.)
Bilopaque
Biltricide (Bayer)
bimakalim (INN)
bimatoprost (USAN)
bindarit (INN)
binedaline (INN)
binetrakin (INN)
binfloxacin (INN)
binifibrate (INN)
biniramycin (INN)
binizolast (INN)
binodenoson (USAN)
binospirone (INN)
Bio-Statin
Bio-Tropin
Biobase
BioCox (Zoetis)
Biodine
Biofed
Biolon 
Biomox (Virbac)
Bion Tears (Alcon)
Biopatch (Ethicon Inc.)
bioresmethrin (INN)
Bioscrub
BioThrax (Emergent BioSolutions)
biotin (INN)
Biozyme-C

Bip-Bis  

bipenamol (INN)
biperiden (INN)
biphasic insulin injection (INN)
Biphetamine
Biphetap
biricodar (INN)
biriperone (INN)
Bisac-Evac
bisacodyl (INN)
bisantrene (INN)
bisaramil (INN)
bisbendazole (INN)
bisbentiamine (INN)
bisdisulizole disodium (USAN)
bisegliptin (INN)
bisfenazone (INN)
bisfentidine (INN)
bismuth subcitrate potassium (USAN)
bisnafide (INN)
bisoctrizole (USAN)
bisobrin (INN)
bisoprolol (INN)
bisorcic (INN)
bisoxatin (INN)

Bit-Biz  

bithionol (INN)
bithionoloxide (INN)
bitipazone (INN)
bitolterol (INN)
bitoscanate (INN)
bivalirudin (INN)
bivatuzumab mertansine (INN)
bixalomer (USAN, INN)
bizelesin (INN)

Bl-Bm  

Blenoxane (Bristol-Myers Squibb) 
bleomycin (INN)
Bleph-10 (Allergan)
Blephamide (Allergan)
blinatumomab (USAN, INN)
Blis-To-Sol (Oakhurst Company)
Blocadren (Merck)
blonanserin (INN)
blosozumab (INN)
Bluboro
bluensomycin (INN)
BMS 337039
BMS-232632

Bo  

BO Supprettes
boceprevir (USAN, INN)
bofumustine (INN)
bolandiol (INN)
bolasterone (INN)
bolazine (INN)
boldenone (INN)
bolmantalate (INN)
bometolol (INN)
Bonamine
Bonefos (Bayer)
Bonine (Insight Pharmaceuticals)
Boniva (Genentech)
Bontril (Valeant Pharmaceuticals)
bopindolol (INN)
bornaprine (INN)
bornaprolol (INN)
bornelone (INN)
Borofair (Major Pharmaceuticals)
Borofax
bortezomib (USAN)
Bosatria (GlaxoSmithKline)
bosentan (INN)
bosutinib (USAN, INN)
botiacrine (INN)
Botox (Allergan)
Boudreaux's Butt Paste (Blairex Laboratories)
boxidine (INN)